Dixon's Return is a 1924 British silent comedy film directed by Manning Haynes and starring Moore Marriott, Leal Douglas and Tom Coventry.

Cast
 Moore Marriott as Bob Dixon  
 Leal Douglas as Mrs. Dixon  
 Tom Coventry as Uncle  
 Harry Ashton as Night Watchman  
 Bob Vallis
 J. Edwards Barker 
 Toby Cooper

References

Bibliography
 Murphy, Robert. Directors in British and Irish Cinema: A Reference Companion. British Film Institute, 2006.

External links

1924 films
1924 comedy films
British silent short films
British comedy films
Films based on works by W. W. Jacobs
Films directed by H. Manning Haynes
British black-and-white films
1920s English-language films
1920s British films
Silent comedy films